Daniel Fagiani (born 22 January 1974 in Argentina) is an Argentinean retired footballer who last played for Argentino de Rosario in his home country.

Career

Fagiani started his senior career with Newell's Old Boys. In 1999, he signed for Valencia CF in the Spanish La Liga, where he made twelve appearances and scored zero goals. After that he played for Boca Juniors, Atlético Madrid, San Lorenzo de Almagro, Club de Gimnasia y Esgrima La Plata, CD Numancia, CD Tenerife, and Argentino de Rosario.

Honours
Valencia
Supercopa de España: 1999

References

External links 
 Interview Daniel Fagiani 
 The revelations of a former Boca about the final with Real
 "This River does not even have to start with Boca de Bianchi" 
 Fagiani: If he does well, he will direct the next Cup 
 Fagiani: "The leaders do nothing for the good of the club"

1974 births
Argentine footballers
Argentino de Rosario footballers
Living people
Valencia CF players
Association football midfielders